Carleton—Charlotte was a federal electoral district in New Brunswick, Canada, that was represented in the House of Commons of Canada from 1968 to 1997.

The riding was created in the redistribution of electoral districts in 1966. It consisted of the counties of Carleton and Charlotte, as well as southern portions of York and Sunbury Counties. Charlotte County was formerly its own electoral district, while Carleton County was part of the Victoria—Carleton riding.

In the 1996 redistribution, Carleton—Charlotte was abolished. Most of Carleton County became part of the new Tobique—Mactaquac, while the rest became part of New Brunswick Southwest.

Members of Parliament

This riding elected the following Members of Parliament:

Election results

|-
 
|Liberal
|Harold Culbert
|align="right"|13,970
|align="right"|43.1
|align="right"|+1.5
|-
 
| style="width: 150px" |Progressive Conservative
|Greg Thompson
|align="right"|13,157
|align="right"|40.6
|align="right"|-6.6
|-

|-

|New Democratic Party
|Bill Barteau
|align="right"|1,016
|align="right"|3.1
|align="right"|-4.6

|- bgcolor="white"
!align="left" colspan=3|Total
!align="right"|32,401
!align="right"|
!align="right"|

|-
 
|Progressive Conservative
|Greg Thompson
|align="right"|16,026
|align="right"|47.2
|align="right"|-14.6
|-
 
| style="width: 150px" |Liberal
|Harold Culbert
|align="right"|14,116
|align="right"|41.6
|align="right"|+17.6
|-

|New Democratic Party
|Ben Kilfoil
|align="right"|2,596
|align="right"|7.7
|align="right"|-6.5

|- bgcolor="white"
!align="left" colspan=3|Total
!align="right"|33,921
!align="right"|
!align="right"|

|-
 
|Progressive Conservative
|Fred McCain
|align="right"|19,984
|align="right"|61.8
|align="right"|+14.4
|-
 
| style="width: 150px" |Liberal
|Gerard Daly
|align="right"|7,752
|align="right"|24.0
|align="right"|-12.1
|-

|New Democratic Party
|Ben Kilfoil
|align="right"|4,608
|align="right"|14.2
|align="right"|-1.0
|- bgcolor="white"
!align="left" colspan=3|Total
!align="right"|32,344
!align="right"|
!align="right"|

|-
 
|Progressive Conservative
|Fred McCain
|align="right"|14,565
|align="right"|47.4
|align="right"|-8.2
|-
 
| style="width: 150px" |Liberal
|Joseph Palmer
|align="right"|11,091
|align="right"|36.1
|align="right"|+5.0
|-

|New Democratic Party
|Arthur Slipp
|align="right"|4,680
|align="right"|15.2
|align="right"|+1.9
|-

|Independent
|Janice Brown
|align="right"|407
|align="right"|1.3
|align="right"|+1.3
|- bgcolor="white"
!align="left" colspan=3|Total
!align="right"|30,743
!align="right"|
!align="right"|

|-
 
|Progressive Conservative
|Fred McCain
|align="right"|16,603
|align="right"|55.6
|align="right"|+5.1
|-
 
| style="width: 150px" |Liberal
|Ann Brennan
|align="right"|9,308
|align="right"|31.1
|align="right"|-8.6
|-

|New Democratic Party
|Ed Gaunce
|align="right"|3,971
|align="right"|13.3
|align="right"|+3.5
|- bgcolor="white"
!align="left" colspan=3|Total
!align="right"|29,882
!align="right"|
!align="right"|

|-
 
|Progressive Conservative
|Fred McCain
|align="right"|12,315
|align="right"|50.5
|align="right"|-9.7
|-
 
| style="width: 150px" |Liberal
|Don Beattie
|align="right"|9,681
|align="right"|39.7
|align="right"|+7.5
|-

|New Democratic Party
|Lawrence Bright
|align="right"|2,387
|align="right"|9.8
|align="right"|+2.2
|- bgcolor="white"
!align="left" colspan=3|Total
!align="right"|24,383
!align="right"|
!align="right"|

|-
 
|Progressive Conservative
|Fred McCain
|align="right"|14,431
|align="right"|60.2
|align="right"|-2.6
|-
 
| style="width: 150px" |Liberal
|Donald Hinton
|align="right"|7,715
|align="right"|32.2
|align="right"|-1.6
|-

|New Democratic Party
|Lawrence Bright
|align="right"|1,831
|align="right"|7.6
|align="right"|+4.2
|- bgcolor="white"
!align="left" colspan=3|Total
!align="right"|23,977
!align="right"|
!align="right"|

|-
 
|Progressive Conservative
|Hugh John Flemming
|align="right"|15,469
|align="right"|62.8
|align="right"|*
|-
 
| style="width: 150px" |Liberal
|Henry Hachey
|align="right"|8,330
|align="right"|33.8
|align="right"|*
|-

|New Democratic Party
|Tom Jones
|align="right"|848
|align="right"|3.4
|align="right"|*
|- bgcolor="white"
!align="left" colspan=3|Total
!align="right"|24,647
!align="right"|
!align="right"|

See also 

 List of Canadian federal electoral districts
 Past Canadian electoral districts

External links
 Website of the Parliament of Canada

Former federal electoral districts of New Brunswick